The 2003 FIBA World Championship for Young Women was the first edition of the basketball world championship for U21 women's teams, later known as the FIBA Under-21 World Championship for Women. It was played in Šibenik, Croatia, from 25 July to 3 August 2003. United States women's national under-21 basketball team won the tournament and became the world champions for the first time.

Qualified teams

First round
In the first round, the teams were drawn into two groups of six. The first four teams from each group advance to the quarterfinals, the other teams will play in the 9th–12th place playoffs.

Group A

Group B

9th–12th place playoffs

9th–12th place semifinals

11th place match

9th place match

Championship playoffs

Quarterfinals

5th–8th place playoffs

Semifinals

7th place match

5th place match

3rd place match

Final

Final standings

References

FIBA
International basketball competitions hosted by Croatia
Basketball in Croatia
2003 in Croatian sport
FIBA
FIBA